Vincent Rivaldi Kosasih (born 17 June 1996) is an Indonesian professional basketball player for Pelita Jaya Bakrie Jakarta of the Indonesian Basketball League.

Early and personal life
Born in Madiun, Kosasih grew up in Surabaya. He moved to Jakarta while he attended high school. Afterwards, he continued his studies abroad at the Zhejiang University of Science and Technology located in Hangzhou, Zhejiang, China. He finished his studies there in 2017.

Club career
Vincent Kosasih started out his professional career with Satria Muda where he was roommate with Christian Sitepu. Kosasih recalls that Sitepu provided him with much valuable input.

In 2016, Kosasih joined Stapac Jakarta where he stayed until 2019.

In his two matches at the 2017 IBL Indonesia, Vincent averaged 6.5 points, 7 rebounds and 1 block in around 11 minutes per game.

In early 2021, he signed with his former club's local competitor Pelita Jaya Bakrie Jakarta to replace Adhi Putra who retired.

National team
Vincent Kosasih suited up for both Indonesia men's national under-16 basketball team and Indonesia men's national under-18 basketball team. He was part of the youth national team squads which appeared at the 2011 SEABA Under-16 Championship in Banting, Malaysia and 2012 SEABA Under-18 Championship in Singapore. Then he also appeared at the 2012 FIBA Asia Under-18 Championship in Ulan Bator, Mongolia.

He was a member of the Indonesian national basketball team squad that won the silver medal at the 2017 Southeast Asian Games. He joined the team after Adhi Pratama and Kristian Liem had to withdraw due to injury. He became one of the few Indonesian Centers (and forwards) available for the national team.

Player profile
Kosasih's game has been influenced by several coaches from Eastern Europe. When he and Stapac won the 2019 IBL, he was coached by the Lithuanian Giedrius Žibėnas aka Coach Ghibi. Then in 2020 he joined the Indonesian national team and was trained by the Serbian coach Rajko Toroman.

Wahyu Widayat Jati, 2017 head coach of Indonesia's national team stated that he values Kosasih's defense and rebounding ability.

Career statistics

IBL

Regular season

Playoffs

References

External links
Indonesian Basketball League (IBL) Profile 
FIBA profile
Profile at Eurobasket.com
Profile at RealGM.com

1996 births
Living people
Centers (basketball)
Indonesian expatriates in China
Indonesian men's basketball players
People from Madiun
Sportspeople from Surabaya
Basketball players at the 2018 Asian Games
Competitors at the 2021 Southeast Asian Games
Southeast Asian Games gold medalists for Indonesia
Southeast Asian Games medalists in basketball